Orsett Rural District was the local government district centred on Orsett in south Essex, England from 1894 to 1936; a little of its far west is in modern Greater London. Likewise in modern terms the area is mostly east of the M25 motorway and north of the Thames Estuary. It was formed in 1894. Housing quite few residents, it gradually fell from 62.4 to 49.6 square miles. Its notable omission was Grays or Great Thurrock; Thurrock was the main successor district.

From 1835 until 1894, its parishes fell in the Orsett Poor Law Union (see the Poor Law Amendment Act 1834). For sewerage purposes from 1875 (with Grays Thurrock until 1886) they formed the Orsett Rural Sanitary District, and during the latter's currency the divorce of civil parishes in England from ecclesiastical parishes finalised nationally.

Coverage
The district comprised the parishes of:

Aveley (until 1929)2
Bulphan
Chadwell St Mary (until 1912)1
Corringham
East Tilbury
Fobbing
Horndon-on-the-Hill
Langdon Hills
Little Thurrock
Mucking
North Ockendon 
Orsett
South Ockendon (until 1929)2
Stanford-le-Hope
Stifford
West Thurrock (until 1929)2
West Tilbury

1 to become Tilbury Urban District. 

2 to contribute to the inceptive Purfleet Urban District.

In 1934 parts of Corringham, Fobbing and Laindon Hills contributed to the inceptive Billericay Urban District. 

The rump area, in 1936, joined Thurrock Urban District, save for much of North Ockendon: transferred to Hornchurch Urban District. 

The Thurrock and Purfleet Urban Districts closely resemble today's unitary district of Thurrock (widely known as Thurrock Council).

External links
Boundaries – A Vision of Britain

Political history of Essex
Districts of England created by the Local Government Act 1894
History of local government in London (1889–1965)
History of Thurrock
Rural districts of England